"Thinking of You" is Bonnie Pink's eighteenth single from the album Just a Girl. The single was released under the East West Japan label on May 9, 2001.

Track listing
Thinking of You
Bubble Gum
That's What it's All About

Charts

Oricon Sales Chart

2001 singles
2001 songs
Bonnie Pink songs
Song articles with missing songwriters